The 2013 Syrian Premier League season is the 42nd since its establishment.
This seasons league features two stages. Stage one pits two groups of nine teams and kicked off on 12 February 2013. The top two off each group advances to the Championship Playoff to determine the overall league champions.

All matches were played in Damascus due to security reasons.

Teams

Stadiums and locations

First stage

Each team plays each other once, top two advanced to the championship playoff, bottom two relegate.

Group A

Group B

Second stage

Championship playoff
Each team plays each other once.

All matches will be played in Damascus.

References

Syrian Premier League seasons
1
Syria
1
Syria